Papyridea is a genus of molluscs in the family Cardiidae.

Species
 Papyridea aspersa (G. B. Sowerby I, 1833)
 Papyridea crockeri (A. M. Strong & Hertlein, 1937)
 Papyridea hiulca (Reeve, 1845)
 Papyridea lata (Born, 1778)
 Papyridea semisulcata (J.E. Gray, 1825)
 Papyridea soleniformis (Bruguiere, 1789) — spiny paper cockle

References

Cardiidae
Bivalve genera